Dahiru Musdapher  (15 July 1942 – 22 January 2018) was a Nigerian jurist.  In 2011, he was appointed the Chief Justice of the Supreme Court of Nigeria.  He served as Chief Judge of the Kano State Judiciary from 1979 to 1985 and as a member of the Court of Appeal from 1985 until 2003.

See also

 List of jurists
 List of Nigerians

References 

 

1942 births
2018 deaths
20th-century Nigerian people

20th-century jurists
21st-century Nigerian people

Chief justices of Nigeria
Commanders of the Order of the Niger
People from Jigawa State